William D. Carey (May 20, 1916 – January 27, 2004) was an American singer, songwriter, actor, and author.

Early life
Carey was born on May 20, 1916 in Hollister, California.

Career
Carey acted in Roberta, Old Man Rhythm, Freshman Love, A Yank at Oxford, Something to Sing About, and Campus Confessions.

Carey was a lyricist for Eva Cassidy, Ella Fitzgerald, Billie Holiday, Nat King Cole, George Michael, Joni Mitchell, Frank Sinatra, and Sarah Vaughan. He wrote the words to "Who Wouldn't Love You?".

Personal life and death
Carey had two sons with his first wife, Leona Olsen. His second wife was Ruth Hill Gibian. They resided in Laguna Beach, California.

Carey died on January 27, 2004, at age 87.

References

1916 births
2004 deaths
People from Hollister, California
People from Laguna Beach, California
American male actors
American male songwriters
20th-century American male musicians